South Fork (Mono: qohnihihna ) is an unincorporated community in Madera County, associated with the neighboring town of North Fork California. South Fork lacks a post-office or any distinguishing features aside from a motel resembling one featured in a celebrated Alfred Hitchcock film.

References

Unincorporated communities in California
Unincorporated communities in Madera County, California
Mono tribe